This article details the Hull Kingston Rovers's rugby league football club's 2020 season.

Fixtures and results 
  

All fixtures are subject to change

Challenge Cup

Regular season

Challenge Cup

League standings

Player statistics

Coaching team

Past coaches
 Bryn Knowelden 1952–1955
 Colin Hutton 1957–1970
 Johnny Whiteley 1970–1972
 Harry Poole 1975–1977
 Roger Millward 1977–1991
 George Fairbairn 1991–1994
 Steve Crooks 1994–1997
 Dave Harrison 1997–2000
 Gary Wilkinson 2000–2002
 Steve Linnane 2002–2004
 Martin Hall 2003–2004
 Mal Reilly 2003–2004
 Harvey Howard 2004–2005
 Justin Morgan 2005–2011
 Craig Sandercock 2012–2014
 Chris Chester 2014–2016
 James Webster 2016–2017
 Tim Sheens 2017-2019

2020 squad

2020 transfers

Gains

Losses

Notes

References

External links
 
 Hull KR Junior Robins
 Hull KR history

Hull Kingston Rovers seasons
Super League XXV by club